The Reserve Bank of Malawi is the central bank of Malawi established in the year 1964 located in Lilongwe. The current governor is Wilson Banda.

The Bank is active in promoting financial inclusion policy and is a leading member of the Alliance for Financial Inclusion. It is also one of the original 17 regulatory institutions to make specific national commitments to financial inclusion under the Maya Declaration during the 2011 Global Policy Forum held in Mexico.

The Reserve Bank of Malawi is the only institution permitted to issue the Malawian kwacha, which replaced the Malawian pound in 1971.

Governors
Alan G. Perrin, 1964-1968
D. E. Thomson, 1968-1971
John Tembo, 1971-1984
Chakakala Chaziya, 1984-1986
Stephen Chimwemwe Hara, 1986-1988
Hans Joachim Lesshafft, 1988-1992
Francis Perekamoya, 1992-1995
Mathews Chikaonda, 1995-2000
Elias Ngalande, 2000-2005
Victor Mbewe, 2005-2009
Perks Ligoya, 2009-2012
Charles Chuka, 2012-2017
Dr. Dalitso Kabambe, 2017-2020
Dr. Wilson Banda, 2020-

See also
Economy of Malawi
List of central banks of Africa
List of central banks

References

External links
Reserve Bank of Malawi 

Malawi
Banks of Malawi
Buildings and structures in Lilongwe
Banks established in 1964
1964 establishments in Malawi